Mustilizans drepaniformis is a moth in the family Endromidae. It was described by Ji-Kun Yang in 1995. It is found in Zhejiang, China.

References

Moths described in 1995
Mustilizans